The 1990 Lombard regional election took place on 6 and 7 May 1990. The 5th term of the Regional Council was chosen.

Electoral law 
Election was held under proportional representation with provincial constituencies where the largest remainder method with a Droop quota was used. To ensure more proportionality, remained votes and seats were transferred at regional level and calculated at-large.

Results 
The Christian Democracy party, which had been the leading political force in the region for twenty years, and the Communist Party lost half million votes each while the Lombard League, a new autonomist party led by Umberto Bossi, obtained a sounding victory, entering the Regional Council with 15 councillors, along with one for the Lombard Alliance, and becoming the second largest party in the region. Since that point the Lombard League became a stable political force in Lombardy.

After the election a cabinet led by the incumbent president Giuseppe Giovenzana was formed but, after the Tangentopoli crisis, it was replaced by a succession of governments which included both Lombard League and the former communist PDS.

Seats by province

1990 elections in Italy
Regional elections in Lombardy